Peter Lloyd Stone (30 September 1954 – 21 August 2022) was an Australian association football player who played as a midfielder. He made 15 appearances for the Australia national team.

Club career
Born in Brisbane, Stone played his junior football for Kotara South and Adamstown Rosebud, also playing at senior level for the latter. He went on to play for Western Suburbs in the NSW Super League at state level (1973–1976) and the National Soccer League (1977).

In 1978, he moved to APIA Leichhardt, where he spent three NSL seasons.

Stone moved to St. George in 1980, where he played two seasons.

He retired in 1983, aged 29.

International career
Stone made his international debut for the Australia national team in 1976 against Hong Kong. He earned 15 caps.

References

1954 births
2022 deaths
Australian soccer players
Soccer players from Brisbane
Association football midfielders
Australia international soccer players
National Soccer League (Australia) players
Adamstown Rosebud FC players
APIA Leichhardt FC players
St George FC players